Le Gaulois was a French daily newspaper, founded in 1868 by Edmond Tarbé and Henry de Pène. After a printing stoppage, it was revived by Arthur Meyer in 1882 with notable collaborators Paul Bourget, Alfred Grévin, Abel Hermant, and Ernest Daudet. Among its many famous contributing editors was Guy de Maupassant. Gaston Leroux's novel The Phantom of the Opera was first published as a serialization in its pages between September 1909 and January 1910.

The paper was taken over by Le Figaro in 1929.

References

External links 

 Digitized Issues of Le Gaulois from 5 July 1868 to 30 March 1929 from Gallica, the digital library of the Bibliothèque Nationale de France

1868 establishments in France
1929 disestablishments in France
Defunct newspapers published in France
Newspapers established in 1868
Publications disestablished in 1929